Plužine Municipality (Montenegrin and Serbian: Opština Plužine / Општина Плужине) is one of the municipalities in northwestern region of Montenegro. The administrative center is Town of Plužine. According to the 2011 census, it has a population of 3,235.

Geography and location
The municipality of Pluzine is the seventh largest municipality in Montenegro, but also the municipality with the lowest population density, after Šavnik Municipality. The municipality is located in the northwest of Montenegro, being part of Piva region, named after Piva river. The region is close to the border crossing with Bosnia and Herzegovina (Herzegovina region) for the towns of Gacko and Foča.

Local parliament

Demographics
Town of Plužine is administrative centre of Plužine municipality, which in 2011 had a population of 3,235. The town of Plužine itself has 1,341 citizens.

Ethnic groups (1991 census): 
Montenegrins (91.61%)
Serbs (6.63%)

Ethnic groups (2003 census): 
Serbs (63.92%)
Montenegrins (29.79%)

Ethnic groups (2011 census): 
Serbs (60.78%)
Montenegrins (31.77%)

Gallery

References

External links
 Plužine Municipality

 
Municipalities of Montenegro